Ferrin is a given name and surname. Notable people with the name include:

Given name
 Ferrin Barr Jr. or Jimmy Jack Funk (born 1959), American professional wrestler
 Ferrin C. Campbell (1923–2012), American politician
 Ferrin Fraser (1903–1969), radio scriptwriter and short story author

Surname
 Abi Ferrin, fashion designer
 Antonia Ferrín Moreiras (1914–2009), Spanish mathematician
 Arnie Ferrin (1925–2022), American basketball player, executive, athletic director
 Chad Ferrin (born 1973), American actor
 Diego Ferrín (born 1988), Ecuadorian athlete
 Gino Ferrin (born 1947), German footballer
 Gustavo Ferrín, Uruguayan football manager
 Jennifer Ferrin (born 1979), American actress
 Mary Upton Ferrin (1810–1881), American suffragette and women's rights advocate
 Massimo Ferrin (born 1998), Canadian soccer player
 Samuel Abbott Ferrin (1831–1875), Canadian American politician
 Whitman G. Ferrin (1818–1896), American politician
 Xosé Luís Méndez Ferrín (born 1938), Spanish writer in the Galician language

See also 
 McFerrin, surname
 Ferran, surname
 Ferren, given name and surname